Richard Douglas Bruno (born November 7, 1950) is the head coach of the DePaul Blue Demons women's basketball team. In 2016, he completed his 30th season as head coach. Under his tenure, the Blue Demons have qualified for post-season competition play in 24 of his 33 completed seasons, including the last 17 seasons.

In 2007, Bruno completed a two-year term as President of the Women's Basketball Coaches Association, a position to which he was elected by his peers.

High school and college
Born Douglas Bruno in Normal, Illinois. Doug Bruno played high school basketball at Quigley Preparatory Seminary South. Bruno played college basketball at DePaul University under Basketball Hall of Fame coach Ray Meyer, earning a letter three years, and starting two seasons.

Coaching career

High school

DePaul
Bruno was named the head coach of the DePaul Blue Demons women's basketball program in 1976. In the  first season, the team achieved an 11–10 record,. In the second season the team achieved a 16–6 record, the most wins in the program's history.

Chicago Hustle
Bruno left DePaul to become the head coach of the Chicago Hustle, a women's basketball team in the Women's Professional Basketball League. They were originally going to be called the Hustlers, but that name reminded some of hookers. Bruno suggested changing the name to simply the Hustle. On December 9, 1978, the Chicago Hustle played the Milwaukee Does in what was not just the inaugural game of the Women's Professional Basketball League, but the first professional women's basketball game in the United States. The game was played in the MECCA Arena (now UW–Milwaukee Panther Arena) in Milwaukee, Wisconsin. Bruno was 27 years old, younger than some of his players, trying to keep them calm while waiting to start their first professional game in front of national press services. When an English radio announcer interrupted him with advice, he lessened the tension with a mashup of some famous speeches, invoking the Duke of Wellington and Knute Rockne. He implored his teams, "remember girls, the battle of Dunkirk was won on the playing fields of Eton. Now, go out there and win one for the Gipper."

There were 7,824 people in the stands. Milwaukee scored the first points, but Chicago went on to take the lead. Poor free throw shooting by Milwaukee would prove critical, and Chicago would go on to win the first professional women's basketball game by a score of 92–87.

In their first year, the Hustle tied for the Midwest Division crown. The league lasted three years, but Bruno left the Hustle after his second year. Bruno was involved in what has been called "[t]he WBL's most serious officiating dispute." Bruno thought his point guard was getting roughed up, and had responded by kicking a folding chair in one game, although it was reported that he tossed the folding chair "30 feet across the floor at an official". In a subsequent game, he thought his point guard was fouled with no call, so he went after the referee. Three security guards pulled Bruno off the referee, but not before the fans got involved. The fights included 70 people, requiring a call to the police to restore order. After a delay, the Chicago team won 128–123 in overtime.

Loyola Chicago
Bruno then left coaching women to become the associate men's head coach at Loyola University Chicago under Gene Sullivan. He spent eight years at Loyola, during which the team had two 20 win seasons, and reached the Sweet Sixteen once, in 1984–85.

DePaul
Bruno returned to DePaul and women's basketball in 1988, returning to the head coaching position of the Blue Demons. His first season, the team achieved a 23–10 record, tying for first place in the North Star conference, and qualifying for post-season play. The team finished seventh in the WNIT. His team has qualified for post-season play all but three of the seasons since his return to DePaul. The team was a member of the North Star conference until the 1990–91 season, then was a member of the Great Midwest Conference for four years. That conference then merged to become part of Conference USA, where DePaul remained until joining the Big East in 2005.

In his first year as a member of the Big East, Bruno's Blue Demons achieved a 23–7 record, and made it to the Sweet Sixteen of the NCAA Women's Division I Basketball Championship.

DePaul announced in 2009 that the basketball court at McGrath-Phillips Arena will be named the Doug Bruno Court in his honor. The decision was kept a surprise, and announced at the annual Doug Bruno Challenge Dinner. Doug was told the dinner attendance wasn't meeting expectations, and asked if his six sons could help bolster the attendance by showing up and bringing friends.

USA Basketball

2006 USA U18 and U19 National Team
Bruno was selected to be the head coach of the USA Women's U18 and U19 teams in 2006 and 2007. The U18 team competed for the FIBA Americas Championship, held in Colorado Springs, Colorado from June 28 – July 2, 2006. The USA team defeated Paraguay, Brazil, Argentina, and Canada to win the Gold Medal, and qualify for the 2007 FIBA U19 World Championship, in Bratislava, Slovakia. The following year, Bruno coached the team to a perfect 9–0 record and a Gold Medal at the U19 World Championship. USA would play a close game against Spain in an early round, winning only by eight points 74–66, but in the medal round rematch, USA defeated Spain easily, 69–46. The USA team faced undefeated Sweden in the championship game, but won easily 99–57.

USA Women's National Team
Bruno was named to an assistant coaching position for the USA women's national basketball team. The team begins training in 2009 in preparation for the 2010 World Championships. Training camp was held in Washington, D.C., after which the team visited wounded soldiers at the Walter Reed Army Medical Center. Following completion of the training camp, the team will head to Ekaterinburg, Russia, to compete in the 2009 UMMC Ekaterinburg International Invitational. Bruno served as an assistant coach for the USA National Basketball team at the 2010 World Championships. He will continue as an assistant at the 2012 Olympic games.

Bruno was named assistant coach of the USA National team in preparation for competition at the 2010 World Championships and the 2012 Olympic Games in London. Because many team members were still playing in the WNBA until just prior to the event, the team had only one day of practice with the entire team before leaving for Ostrava and Karlovy Vary, Czech Republic. Even with limited practice, the team managed to win their first game against Greece by 26 points. The team continued to dominate with victory margins exceeding 20 points in the first five games. Several players shared scoring  honors, with Swin Cash, Angel McCoughtry, Maya Moore, Diana Taurasi, Lindsay Whalen, and Sylvia Fowles all ending as high scorer in the first few games. The sixth game was against undefeated Australia—the USA jumped out to a 24-point lead, but the Australian team cut the lead back to single digits late in the game. The USA prevailed 83–75.  The USA won their next two games by over thirty points, then faced the host team, the Czech Republic, in the championship game. The USA team had only a five-point lead at halftime, which was cut to three points, but the Czechs never got closer, and went on to win the championship and gold medal.

Bruno was an assistant coach for the  USA women's national basketball team at the 2016 Olympic Games in Rio de Janeiro.

WBCA
Bruno served as a member of the Board of Directors of the Women's Basketball Coaches Association in 2003 and 2004. Bruno was then elected President of the organization for a two-year team, starting September 1, 2005. His term officially ended in 2007, but he acted as President at the 2009 convention. The organization has a President and a past President—if the President is the coach of a team in the Final Four (occurring the same time as the annual convention), the Past President presides. However, in 2009, both Past President Sherri Coale of Oklahoma, and President Geno Auriemma of Connecticut had teams in the Final Four, so Bruno stepped in as acting President at the annual convention.

Awards and honors
 2008—Carol Eckman Award

Head coaching record (college)

Notes

1950 births
Living people
American men's basketball players
American women's basketball coaches
Basketball coaches from Illinois
Basketball players from Illinois
DePaul Blue Demons men's basketball players
DePaul Blue Demons women's basketball coaches
Guards (basketball)
High school basketball coaches in Illinois
Loyola Ramblers men's basketball coaches
Place of birth missing (living people)
Women's Professional Basketball League coaches